Dark Harvest is an upcoming American fantasy horror film directed by David Slade and written by Michael Gilio, based on the 2006 novel of the same name by Norman Partridge.

Cast

 Casey Likes 
 E'myri Crutchfield 
 Jeremy Davies 
 Elizabeth Reaser 
 Luke Kirby

Production
In September 2019, it was reported that New Regency hired David Slade to direct the adaptation of Dark Harvest with Michael Gilio writing the script and Matt Tolmach and David Manpearl producing. On February 23, 2020, it was reported that MGM acquired the film after New Regency put it on turnaround, and Gilio will also executive produce the film.

In June 2021, it was reported newcomers Casey Likes and E'myri Crutchfield were cast in the lead roles. Later, it was revealed that Jeremy Davies, Elizabeth Reaser and Luke Kirby were added to the cast.

Principal photography commenced at the end of August 2021 in Beausejour and Winnipeg.

Release
The film was originally scheduled for release on September 24, 2021, but was pulled from the schedule due to the COVID-19 pandemic. It was rescheduled to be released on September 9, 2022.

References

External links

Upcoming films
American dark fantasy films
American films about Halloween
Films about bullying
Films based on American horror novels
Films directed by David Slade
Films postponed due to the COVID-19 pandemic
Films produced by Matt Tolmach
Films set in 1963
Films shot in Winnipeg
Halloween horror films
Metro-Goldwyn-Mayer films
Upcoming English-language films